Chris Wakelin (born 16 March 1992) is an English professional snooker player from Rugby, Warwickshire. He practices in Bar 8 in Rugby. He turned professional in 2013 and won his first ranking title at the 2023 Snooker Shoot Out.

Career

Early career
Wakelin started playing snooker aged 8, when his parents Mark and Angie bought him his first mini snooker table, and by the time he was 11 he was successfully playing in the local league. However, his career nearly came to a halt at the age of 17 when he had to start working full-time as an ASDA delivery driver to support himself financially, and only played snooker as a hobby. In 2012 Wakelin decided to give the game another go, but soon had to face more difficulties as family issues resulted in a severe depression: "I could line up but I just couldn’t pot. I thought I would never play again. But thankfully with the help of my friends I managed to turn it around." Since then Wakelin reached the semi-finals of the 2013 English Amateur Championship, before making it through to the England's Under 21 final (where he would later beat Hammad Miah).

These results encouraged him to enter Q School in May. After having made it to the final round of the first event, he again reached the final round at the Event 3. There he faced former professional Adam Wicheard, who led 2–0 before Wakelin hit back to lead 3–2. Then, in the sixth frame when Wakelin had been already 23–0 up, Wicheard accidentally snapped his cue when leaning on it, and had to concede the match. As a result, Wakelin won a tour card for the 2013–14 and 2014–15 seasons.

2013/2014 season
Wakelin had a tough debut season as a professional as he lost his opening match in all the ranking tournaments aside from the UK Championship, where he defeated 22nd seed Ryan Day 6–5 before losing by the same scoreline to Jamie Burnett in the subsequent round. He had better results in the minor-ranking European Tour events, reaching the last 32 of the Rotterdam Open before going all the way to the quarterfinals of the Kay Suzanne Memorial Cup, where he lost 4–2 to Judd Trump. Wakelin's season ended when he was edged out 10–9 by Paul Davison in the first round of World Championship qualifying, with him ranked world number 106 after his first year on tour.

2014/2015 season
Wakelin's second season on the tour was a vast improvement on his first. He beat Tom Ford 5–2 to qualify for the 2014 Wuxi Classic and in his first appearance in a ranking event outside of the UK he overcame Joe O'Connor 5–2, before losing 5–2 to Shaun Murphy. At the minor-ranking Ruhr Open, Wakelin overcame Matthew Stevens 4–1 and then fought back from 3–0 and needing two snookers in the deciding frame to beat Thepchaiya Un-Nooh 4–3. A 4–2 win over Fergal O'Brien saw him reach the quarter-finals where he lost 4–1 to Judd Trump. At the Indian Open, Wakelin beat Rhys Clark 4–2, Andrew Pagett 4–1 and Nigel Bond 4–1 to play in the quarter-finals of a ranking event for the first time. He was 2–1 ahead of Michael White, but would lose 4–2.

Wakelin's performances in the European Tour events this season saw him finish a lofty 22nd on the Order of Merit to earn a new two-year tour card. It also gave him entry into the Grand Final where he whitewashed Robert Milkins 4–0, before Matthew Selt ousted Wakelin 4–2 in the second round.

2015/2016 season
Wakelin saw off Alex Taubman 5–1, Craig Steadman 5–0 and Liam Highfield 5–2 to reach the final qualifying round of the Australian Goldfields Open, but lost 5–3 to Jamie Jones. A 6–4 victory over Peter Lines saw him qualify for the International Championship, where he lost 6–4 to Barry Hawkins having led 3–1. Wakelin beat Matthew Stevens 6–5 on the final black in the first round of the UK Championship and apologized to his opponent for an exuberant celebration at the end in a win he described as one of his best. He was defeated 6–2 by Michael Holt in the second round. Wakelin qualified for the China Open by eliminating Kurt Maflin 5–3 and was edged out 5–4 by Matthew Selt in the first round. After beating world number 25 and former practice partner Ben Woollaston 10–9, Wakelin looked set to reach the final qualifying round for the World Championship after leading Anthony Hamilton 4–0 and 9–6, but went on to lose 10–9.

2016/2017 season
Wins over Allan Taylor and Anthony McGill saw Wakelin set up a third round encounter with Ronnie O'Sullivan in the third round of the English Open. Wakelin recovered from 2–0 down to triumph 4–3 in a performance that included a century and two other breaks above 50. He then edged past Xiao Guodong 4–3 after trailing 3–1 to play in the quarterfinals, where he lost 5–0 to Stuart Bingham. Wakelin was defeated 6–4 by Peter Lines in the second round of the UK Championship and 4–0 by Anthony Hamilton in the third round of the Scottish Open. Wakelin ended a season inside the top 64 for the first time as he was the world number 63.

Performance and rankings timeline

Career finals

Ranking finals: 1

Amateur wins

 English Under-21 Open – 2013

References

External links

Chris Wakelin at worldsnooker.com

1992 births
Living people
English snooker players
Sportspeople from Rugby, Warwickshire